The following is a list of chemicals published as a requirement of Safe Drinking Water and Toxic Enforcement Act of 1986, commonly known as California Proposition 65, that are "known to the state to cause cancer or reproductive toxicity" as of January 3, 2020.  As a result of lawsuits, the list also contains substances known only to cause cancer in animals.

This list is not exhaustive, as the complete list contains over 900 chemicals.

Chemicals currently listed under California Proposition 65

Annotation

Chemicals that were formerly listed under California Proposition 65

† Numerical identifier assigned by the Chemical Abstracts Service (CAS)

Comments:
 Many substances include its strong acid salts
 Airborne particles of many substances are cancerogenic
 Several chemical commodities were removed in the last years
 Bisphenol A (BPA) was removed from the list on April 19, 2013, and was relisted on May 11, 2015.

References

Chemistry-related lists
Regulation of chemicals
Regulation in the United States